Efek Rumah Kaca is the first studio album by Efek Rumah Kaca. It was released in 2007 by Paviliun Records.

Production
On "Di Udara", they assessed market interest for an ideologically or politically themed song. Cholil, the vocalist, wrote most of the lyrics for this album.

Track listing

Musical styles
According to a review by Aditya Suharmoko in The Jakarta Post, "Cinta Melulu" and "Jatuh Cinta Itu Biasa Saja" are mellow but do not sound "cheesy", while "Di Udara" has a grim tone. The band called the music mostly introverted and has a slow tempo.

Themes
"Di Udara" is dedicated to Munir, a human rights activist who was killed on a plane. The lyrics of "Efek Rumah Kaca" are about global warming, while "Bukan Lawan Jenis" addresses homosexuality. "Jatuh Cinta Itu Biasa Saja" states that blind love is not good. "Cinta Melulu" criticized the tendencies exhibited by Indonesian love songs, especially infidelity. "Melankolia" describes Choilil's mourning upon the death of his father, exhibited through the lyrics "Sadness is beautiful, it slows down the flow of blood". "Belanja Terus Sampai Mati" is an indictment of materialism.

Releases and receptions
As of 2008, the album has sold more than 4000 copies, making it Paviliun Records best-selling release. Suharmoko described the album as "breathtaking and brilliant". The royalties for the ringback tone for "Di Udara" were given to Munir's family.
Rolling Stone Indonesia chose ""Di Udara" and "Cinta Melulu" as the 131st and 143rd best Indonesian songs of all time, respectively, in their December 2009 issue. The album was awarded Rolling Stone Indonesia's Rookie of the Year in 2008; that same year it was nominated for an MTV Asia award as well as an AMI award.

References

2007 albums
Indonesian-language albums
Efek Rumah Kaca albums